Glycine encephalopathy  is a rare autosomal recessive disorder of glycine metabolism. After phenylketonuria, glycine encephalopathy is the second most common disorder of amino acid metabolism. The disease is caused by defects in the glycine cleavage system, an enzyme responsible for glycine catabolism. There are several forms of the disease, with varying severity of symptoms and time of onset. The symptoms are exclusively neurological in nature, and clinically this disorder is characterized by abnormally high levels of the amino acid glycine in bodily fluids and tissues, especially the cerebrospinal fluid.

Glycine encephalopathy is sometimes referred to as "nonketotic hyperglycinemia" (NKH), as a reference to the biochemical findings seen in patients with the disorder, and to distinguish it from the disorders that cause "ketotic hyperglycinemia" (seen in propionic acidemia and several other inherited metabolic disorders). To avoid confusion, the term "glycine encephalopathy" is often used, as this term more accurately describes the clinical symptoms of the disorder.

Signs and symptoms
It typically presents as a severe encephalopathy with myoclonic seizures, is rapidly progressive and eventually results in respiratory arrest. Standard evaluation for inborn errors of metabolism and other causes of this presentation does not reveal any abnormality (no acidosis, no hypoglycaemia, or hyperammonaemia and no other organ affected). Pronounced and sustained hiccups in an encephalopathic infant have been described as a typical observation in non-ketotic hyperglycinaemia.

Genetics

Glycine encephalopathy has an estimated incidence of 1 in 60,000, making it the second most common disorder of amino acid metabolism, after phenylketonuria. It is caused by a defect in the glycine cleavage system (GCS), which is made up of four protein subunits. Each of these four subunits is encoded by a separate gene. Defects in three of these four genes have been linked to glycine encephalopathy.

There is a fourth unit in the complex, dihydrolipoamide dehydrogenase or GCSL. However, to date there have been no mutations in GCSL found to be associated with glycine encephalopathy.

A small percentage of affected individuals do not have detectable mutations in any of the three genes (listed above) that are typically associated with the disease. However, they still show defective glycine-cleavage enzymatic activity. It is thought that these patients may have mutations in the genes encoding one of the cofactors associated with the GCS complex.

Defects in the GCS proteins can prevent the complex from functioning properly or can prevent the GCS complex from forming entirely. When the complex is unable to metabolize glycine properly, this causes excess glycine to build up to toxic levels in the body's organs and tissues. Damage caused by elevated levels of glycine in the brain and cerebrospinal fluid is responsible for the characteristic seizures, breathing difficulties, movement disorders, and intellectual disability.

This disorder is inherited in an autosomal recessive pattern. The term "autosomal" signifies that the gene associated with the disorder is located on an autosome. In an autosomal recessive inheritance pattern, two defective copies of the gene (one inherited from each parent) are required in order for a child to be born with the disorder. Therefore, each parent of an individual with an autosomal recessive disorder has at least one defective copy of the gene. With autosomal recessive disorders, individuals with only one copy of a defective gene (heterozygotes) are considered "carriers" for the disorder. Carriers usually do not show signs or symptoms of the disorder.

Pathophysiology
Glycine is the simplest amino acid, having no stereoisomers. It can act as a neurotransmitter in the brain, act as an inhibitor in the spinal cord and brain stem, while having excitatory effects in the cortex of the brain. Glycine is metabolized to final end products of ammonia and carbon dioxide through the glycine cleavage system (GCS), an enzyme complex made up of four protein subunits. Defects in these subunits can cause glycine encephalopathy, although some causes of the disease are still unknown. Normally, GCS shows its highest enzymatic activity in liver, brain and placental tissue. One of its main functions is to maintain normal glycine levels in the brain. Defects in GCS cause an increase of glycine concentration in blood plasma and cerebrospinal fluid. The exact pathophysiology of the disorder is not known, but it is considered likely that buildup of glycine in the brain is responsible for the symptoms.

All forms of glycine encephalopathy show elevated levels of glycine in the plasma, as well as in cerebral spinal fluid (CSF).  Glycine concentrations in the CSF of affected patients are typically more markedly elevated than in plasma, leading to a corresponding elevation in the ratio of glycine concentrations in the cerebral spinal fluid to that in the plasma. This ratio can also be slightly elevated in patients receiving valproic acid.

Glycine encephalopathy (nonketotic hyperglycinemia, or NKH) should not be confused with other metabolic disorders that can produce elevated glycine levels. For example, certain inherited 'organic acidurias' (aka 'organic acidemias') can produce elevated glycine in plasma and urine, although these disorders are not caused by defects in the glycine cleavage system, and they are not typically accompanied by corresponding elevations of glycine in cerebrospinal fluid (CSF). Glycine encephalopathy is unique in the fact that levels of glycine are disproportionately elevated in CSF (in addition to elevations in blood and urine), whereas CSF glycine levels are normal or near-normal in patients with inherited organic acidurias.

Glycine metabolism
Glycine is metabolized in the body's cells to end products of carbon dioxide and ammonia. The glycine cleavage system, which is responsible for glycine metabolism in the mitochondria is made up of four protein subunits, the P-protein, H-protein, T-protein and L-protein.

Diagnosis

Classification

There are several different forms of glycine encephalopathy, which can be distinguished by the age of onset, as well as the types and severity of symptoms. All forms of glycine encephalopathy present with only neurological symptoms, including intellectual disability (IQ scores below 20 are common), hypotonia, apneic seizures, and brain malformations.

With the classical, or neonatal presentation of glycine encephalopathy, the infant is born after an unremarkable pregnancy, but presents with lethargy, hypotonia, apneic seizures and myoclonic jerks, which can progress to apnea requiring artificial ventilation, and often death. Apneic patients can regain spontaneous respiration in their second to third week of life. After recovery from the initial episode, patients have intractable seizures and profound intellectual disability, remaining developmentally delayed. Some mothers comment retrospectively that they noticed fetal rhythmic "hiccuping" episodes during pregnancy, most likely reflecting seizure episodes in utero. Patients with the infantile form of glycine encephalopathy do not show lethargy and coma in the neonatal period, but often have a history of hypotonia. They often have seizures, which can range in severity and responsiveness to treatment, and they are typically developmentally delayed. Glycine encephalopathy can also present as a milder form with episodic seizures, ataxia, movement disorders, and gaze palsy during febrile illness. These patients are also developmentally delayed, to varying degrees. In the later onset form, patients typically have normal intellectual function, but present with spastic diplegia and optic atrophy. The mild form of the disorder corresponds to greatly reduced but not fully absent GCS activity.

Transient neonatal hyperglycinemia has been described in a very small number of cases. Initially, these patients present with the same symptoms and laboratory results that are seen in the classical presentation. However, levels of glycine in plasma and cerebrospinal fluid typically normalize within eight weeks, and in five of six cases there were no neurological issues detected at follow-up times up to thirteen years. A single patient was severely retarded at nine months. The suspected cause of transient neonatal hyperglicinemia is attributed to low activity of the glycine cleavage system in the immature brain and liver of the neonate.

Treatment
A treatment of sodium benzoate, which binds to glycine and forms hippurate, and dextromethorphan, which weakly inhibits the N-methyl-D-aspartate receptors that glycine acts on has been shown to improve outcomes in select cases where the disorder is present in attenuated form.

Prognosis 
The prognosis is very poor. Two studies reported typical age of deaths in infancy or early childhood, with the first reporting a median age of death of 2.6 for boys and less than 1 month for girls.

Research 
Response to treatment is variable and the long-term and functional outcome is unknown. To provide a basis for improving the understanding of the epidemiology, genotype/phenotype correlation and outcome of these diseases their impact on the quality of life of patients, and for evaluating diagnostic and therapeutic strategies a patient registry was established by the noncommercial International Working Group on Neurotransmitter Related Disorders (iNTD).

See also
 List of amino acid metabolism disorders
 inborn errors of metabolism

References

External links 

Amino acid metabolism disorders
Inborn errors of metabolism
Autosomal recessive disorders
Rare diseases

pl:Nieketonowa hiperglicynemia
sr:Хиперглицинемија